Richard Abingdon may refer to:

Richard de Abyndon or Abingdon (died 1327), English judge
Richard Abingdon (MP) (died 1545), Member of Parliament (MP) for Bristol